Christopher Street was a gay-oriented magazine published in New York City, New York, by Charles Ortleb. Known both for its serious discussion of issues within the gay community and its satire of anti-gay criticism, it was one of the two most widely read gay-issues publications in the United States. Christopher Street covered politics and culture and its aim was to become a gay equivalent of The New Yorker.

The magazine featured original fiction and non-fiction work from such notable authors as Andrew Holleran, Felice Picano, Gore Vidal, Edmund White, and John Preston, as well as emerging gay writers such as Christopher Bram, Allen Barnett, John Fox, Scott Heim, John Alan Lee, Patrick Merla, Randy Shilts and Matthew Stadler. The cartoons signed (Rick) Fiala, Lublin, (Henryk) Baum, Bertram Dusk, Dean, and March were all drawn by Rick Fiala, the founding art director of Christopher Street.

First published in July 1976, Christopher Street printed 231 issues before closing its doors in December 1995.

Collections of Christopher Street material
 And God Bless Uncle Harry and His Roommate Jack Who We Are Not Supposed to Talk About: cartoons from Christopher Street magazine, Avon Books, 1978 .
 Aphrodisiac, fiction from Christopher Street. New York: Coward, McCann & Geoghegan, 1980 . Reprinted unchanged, New York: Putnam, 1982.
 Charles Ortleb and Richard Fiala, Le gay ghetto: gay cartoons from Christopher Street, St. Martin's Press, 1980 .
 The Christopher Street Reader, ed. Michael Denneny; Charles Ortleb; Thomas Steele. New York: Coward, McCann & Geoghegan, 1983 . Issued in Britain as The View from Christopher Street, Chatto & Windus, 1984 . 
 First Love/Last Love: New Fiction from Christopher Street, ed. Michael Denneny; Charles Ortleb; Thomas Steele. New York: Putnam, 1985 .
 Boyd McDonald, Cruising the Movies: A Sexual Guide to "Oldies" on TV, Gay Presses of New York, 1985 : a collection of movie reviews, all but a few first published in Christopher Street.
 Quentin Crisp, How to Go to the Movies: A Guide for the Perplexed, St. Martin's Press, 1989 : more Christopher Street movie reviews.
 Andrew Holleran. Ground Zero. New York : Morrow, 1988. . Collection of essays from Christopher Street written in real time as AIDS devastated the gay commnity of New York.

References

LGBT-related magazines published in the United States
Monthly magazines published in the United States
News magazines published in the United States
Magazines established in 1976
Magazines disestablished in 1995
Defunct literary magazines published in the United States
LGBT literature in the United States
Magazines published in New York City